Snap general elections were held in the British Virgin Islands on 17 November 1986. The result was a victory for the Virgin Islands Party (VIP) led by Chief Minister Lavity Stoutt over the United Party (UP). Subsequent to the election, Ralph T. O'Neal became leader of the opposition despite not being head of the UP.

The VIP won five of the nine available seats giving it an absolute majority. Conrad Maduro and Ralph O'Neal were the only members of the UP to win a seat.  Maduro only won by a single vote, and O'Neal would change allegiance to the Virgin Islands Party before the next general election.  Two candidates running as independents, Walwyn Brewley and former Chief Minister Cyril Romney, were elected.  The election victory would make the start of 17 consecutive years in power for the VIP, which would only end in the 2003 general election.

Although Stoutt had lost the previous election, former Chief Minister Cyril Romney had been forced to step down on 1 October 1986 by Governor David Barwick, and so Stoutt had assumed Premiership by virtue of leadership of the largest party in the house prior to the election.

Janice George-Creque served as the supervisor of elections.  The turnout was 67.5% across the Territory, although this masked regional variations in the individual district seats.  Turnout was highest in the 9th District (81.3%) and lowest in the 2nd (60.3%) and 3rd (60.6%) Districts.  The 2nd District was decided by a single vote.

Background
Whilst serving as Chief Minister Romney was the 99% owner of a trust company called Financial Management Trust, which had been linked with laundering drugs money. Although Romney was not personally implicated in the money laundering scheme, he was serving as Chief Minister at the time, the Legislative Council resolved to debate a no-confidence motion, and Governor Barwick ordered Romney to step down.  To preempt the motion, Romney dissolved the Legislative Council and called a general election.

Results
Although Romney himself was returned as the representative for Fifth District, his coalition partners in the United Party were beaten by Lavity Stoutt's Virgin Islands Party.  The former coalition won only three seats: Romney himself, Conrad Maduro (and Maduro's victory was by a single vote), and Ralph O'Neal.  O'Neal was appointed leader of the opposition, but that role would pass to Maduro when O'Neal later joined the Virgin Islands Party.

The defeat of Q.W. Osborne was the end of his political career.  Willard Wheatley also suffered the first defeat of his political career, but would continue in politics.

By district
The winners of the district seats were as follows:

First Electoral District

Total number of registered voters: 929
Total number of votes cast: 641
Percentage of voters who voted: 69.0%

Second Electoral District

Total number of registered voters: 398
Total number of votes cast: 241
Percentage of voters who voted: 60.6%

Third Electoral District

Total number of registered voters: 740
Total number of votes cast: 446
Percentage of voters who voted: 60.3%

Fourth Electoral District

Total number of registered voters: 801
Total number of votes cast: 554
Percentage of voters who voted: 69.2%

Fifth Electoral District

Total number of registered voters: 693
Total number of votes cast: 436
Percentage of voters who voted: 62.9%

Sixth Electoral District

Total number of registered voters: 688
Total number of votes cast: 464
Percentage of voters who voted: 67.4%

Seventh Electoral District

Total number of registered voters: 456
Total number of votes cast: 303
Percentage of voters who voted: 66.4%

Eighth Electoral District

Total number of registered voters: 521
Total number of votes cast: 349
Percentage of voters who voted: 67.0%

Ninth Electoral District

Total number of registered voters: 722
Total number of votes cast: 587
Percentage of voters who voted: 81.3%

IND = Independent
PP = People's Party
UP = BVI United Party
VIP = Virgin Islands Party

In the 1st District, Lavity Stoutt secured both the highest number of individual votes, and the highest percentage of the vote of any candidate.

References

1986
1986 elections in the Caribbean
General election
1986 elections in British Overseas Territories
November 1986 events in North America